Charles Douglas Stimson (1857–1929) was a prominent businessman in Seattle, Washington.

He was the son of Thomas Douglas Stimson (1827–1898), a lumber baron with extensive properties in Michigan. He built the Colonnade Hotel in 1900. It was designed by Charles H. Bebb. He also had property in Los Angeles. He left his family an inheritance.

C. D. Stimson came to Seattle in 1888 as he and his brother Fred sought ought virgin forest to exploit. He built a mansion at 1204 Minor Avenue on First Hill for his family. It was designed by Spokane architect Kirtland Cutter and built in 1901, a couple of years after the Great Seattle Fire. It is a Seattle Landmark. It remained in the family for decades and is now known as the Stimson-Green Mansion.

C. D. Stimson hired C. R. Aldrick to design the Exchange Building in 1904.

Stimson and his brother Frederick Spencer Stimson (1868–1921) owned several Seattle businesses and the Hollywood Farm in King County's Hollywood District. They built mansion retreats in Woodinville.

Stimson's daughter Dorothy Bullitt founded King Broadcasting in 1947. Her children became philanthropists giving to community and conservation causes in and around Seattle. Stimson Bullitt was her son.

See also
Stimson House in Los Angeles
List of Seattle Landmarks

References

Businesspeople from Los Angeles
1857 births
1929 deaths
19th-century American businesspeople
20th-century American businesspeople
Businesspeople from Seattle